This is a list of 246 species in Leucophenga, a genus of fruit flies in the family Drosophilidae.

Leucophenga species

 Leucophenga abbreviata (Meijere, 1911) c g
 Leucophenga aculeata  g
 Leucophenga acuticauda  g
 Leucophenga acutifoliacea  g
 Leucophenga acutipennis Malloch, 1926 c g
 Leucophenga acutipollinosa Okada, 1987 c g
 Leucophenga africana Bachli, 1971 c g
 Leucophenga albiceps (Meijere, 1914) c g
 Leucophenga albifascia Okada, 1966 c g
 Leucophenga albiterga  g
 Leucophenga albofasciata (Macquart, 1851) c g
 Leucophenga ambigua Kahl, 1917 c g
 Leucophenga angulata Singh, Dash & Fartyal, 2000 c g
 Leucophenga angusta Okada, 1956 c g
 Leucophenga angustifoliacea  g
 Leucophenga apicifera (Adams, 1905) c g
 Leucophenga apunctata Huang & Chen g
 Leucophenga arcuata Huang & Chen g
 Leucophenga argentata (Meijere, 1914) c g
 Leucophenga argenteiventris Kahl, 1917 c g
 Leucophenga argenteofasciata Kahl, 1917 c g
 Leucophenga argentina (Meijere, 1924) c g
 Leucophenga atra Bachli, 1971 c g
 Leucophenga atrinervis Okada, 1968 c g
 Leucophenga atriventris Lin & Wheeler, 1972 c g
 Leucophenga baculifoliacea  g
 Leucophenga bakeri (Sturtevant, 1927) c g
 Leucophenga basilaris (Adams, 1905) c g
 Leucophenga bella Curran, 1928 c g
 Leucophenga bellula (Bergroth, 1894) c g
 Leucophenga bezzii Sturtevant, 1927 c g
 Leucophenga bifasciata Duda, 1923 c g
 Leucophenga bifurcata  g
 Leucophenga bimaculata (Loew, 1866) c g
 Leucophenga bistriata Kahl, 1917 c g
 Leucophenga bivirgata Bachli, 1971 c g
 Leucophenga boninensis Wheeler & Takada, 1964 c g
 Leucophenga brazilensis Malloch, 1924 c g
 Leucophenga brevifoliacea Huang & Chen g
 Leucophenga brunneipennis Kahl, 1917 c g
 Leucophenga burlai Bachli, 1971 c g
 Leucophenga buxtoni Duda, 1935 c g
 Leucophenga caliginosa Bachli, 1971 c g
 Leucophenga candida Bock, 1989 c g
 Leucophenga capillata Bachli, 1971 c g
 Leucophenga chaco Wheeler, 1968 c g
 Leucophenga champawatensis Fartyal & Singh, 2005 c g
 Leucophenga cincta (Meijere, 1911) c g
 Leucophenga clubiata Singh, Dash, and Fartyal, 2000 c g
 Leucophenga concilia Okada, 1956 c g
 Leucophenga confluens Duda, 1923 c g
 Leucophenga cooperensis Bock, 1979 c g
 Leucophenga cornuta  g
 Leucophenga costata Okada, 1966 c g
 Leucophenga cultella  g
 Leucophenga cuneata Bachli, 1971 c g
 Leucophenga curvipila Duda, 1939 c g
 Leucophenga cuthbertsoni Malloch, 1929 c g
 Leucophenga cyanorosa Bock, 1979 c g
 Leucophenga cyclophylla  g
 Leucophenga decaryi (Seguy, 1932) c g
 Leucophenga denigrata Bachli, 1971 c g
 Leucophenga dentata Bachli, 1971 c g
 Leucophenga digmasoma Lin & Wheeler, 1972 c g
 Leucophenga dilatata Bachli, 1971 c g
 Leucophenga disjuncta Bachli, 1971 c g
 Leucophenga domanda Bock, 1984 c g
 Leucophenga dudai Bachli, 1971 c g
 Leucophenga edwardsi Bachli, 1971 c g
 Leucophenga elegans Duda, 1927 c g
 Leucophenga euryphylla Huang & Chen g
 Leucophenga falcata Huang & Chen g
 Leucophenga fenchihuensis Okada, 1987 c g
 Leucophenga fenestrata Duda, 1927 c g
 Leucophenga ferrari Bachli, Vilela & McEvey, 2005 c g
 Leucophenga flaviclypeata  g
 Leucophenga flavicosta Duda, 1926 c g
 Leucophenga flaviseta (Adams, 1905) c g
 Leucophenga flavohalterata Malloch, 1925 c g
 Leucophenga flavopuncta Malloch, 1925 c g
 Leucophenga formosa Okada, 1987 c g
 Leucophenga frontalis (Williston, 1896) c g
 Leucophenga fuscinotata Huang & Chen g
 Leucophenga fuscipedes  g
 Leucophenga fuscipennis Duda, 1923 c g
 Leucophenga fuscithorax Huang & Chen g
 Leucophenga fuscorbitata Bachli, 1971 c g
 Leucophenga gibbosa (Meijere, 1914) c g
 Leucophenga glabella Huang & Chen g
 Leucophenga goodi Kahl, 1917 c g
 Leucophenga gracilenta  g
 Leucophenga grossipalpis (Lamb, 1914) c g
 Leucophenga guro Burla, 1954 c g
 Leucophenga guttata Wheeler, 1952 i c g
 Leucophenga hasemani Kahl, 1917 c g
 Leucophenga helvetica Bachli, Vilela & Haring, 2002 c g
 Leucophenga hirsutina Huang & Chen g
 Leucophenga hirticeps  g
 Leucophenga hirudinis Huang & Chen g
 Leucophenga horea Tsacas & Chassagnard, 1991 c g
 Leucophenga hungarica Papp, 2000 c g
 Leucophenga imminuta Bachli, 1971 c g
 Leucophenga incurvata Bachli, 1971 c g
 Leucophenga insulana (Schiner, 1868) c g
 Leucophenga interrupta Duda, 1924 c g
 Leucophenga iriomotensis Chen & Aotsuka, 2003 c g
 Leucophenga isaka Bachli, Vilela & McEvey, 2005 c g
 Leucophenga ivontaka Bachli, Vilela & McEvey, 2005 c g
 Leucophenga jacobsoni Duda, 1926 c g
 Leucophenga janicae Bock, 1979 c g
 Leucophenga japonica Sidorenko, 1991 c g
 Leucophenga kilembensis Bachli, 1971 c g
 Leucophenga kurahashii Okada, 1987 c g
 Leucophenga lacteusa Takada & Wakahama, 1967 c g
 Leucophenga latevittata Duda, 1939 c g
 Leucophenga latifascia  g
 Leucophenga latifrons Duda, 1923 c g
 Leucophenga latipenis  g
 Leucophenga limbipennis (Meijere, 1908) c g
 Leucophenga londti Bachli, Vilela & McEvey, 2005 c g
 Leucophenga lubrica Bock, 1979 c g
 Leucophenga lynettae Bock, 1984 c g
 Leucophenga maculata (Dufour, 1839) c g
 Leucophenga maculosa (Coquillett, 1895) i c g b
 Leucophenga magnicauda  g
 Leucophenga magnipalpis Duda, 1923 c g
 Leucophenga magnornata Bachli, 1971 c g
 Leucophenga malgachensis Bachli, Vilela & McEvey, 2005 c g
 Leucophenga mananara Bachli, Vilela & McEvey, 2005 c g
 Leucophenga mansura (Adams, 1905) c g
 Leucophenga meijerei Duda, 1924 c g
 Leucophenga melanogaster Tsacas & Chassagnard, 1991 c g
 Leucophenga meredithiana Okada, 1987 c g
 Leucophenga montana Wheeler, 1952 i c g
 Leucophenga muden Bachli, Vilela & McEvey, 2005 c g
 Leucophenga multipunctata Chen & Aotsuka, 2003 c g
 Leucophenga munroi Duda, 1939 c g
 Leucophenga mutabilis (Adams, 1905) c g
 Leucophenga neoangusta Godbole & Vaidya, 1976 c g
 Leucophenga neointerrupta Fartyal & Toda, 2005 g
 Leucophenga neolacteusa Singh & Bhatt, 1988 c g
 Leucophenga neopalpalis Bachli, 1971 c g
 Leucophenga neovaria Wheeler, 1960 i c g
 Leucophenga neovittata Bachli, 1971 c g
 Leucophenga nigriceps Okada, 1966 c g
 Leucophenga nigrinervis Duda, 1924 c g
 Leucophenga nigripalpalis Tsacas & Chassagnard, 1991 c g
 Leucophenga nigripalpis Duda, 1923 c g
 Leucophenga nigrorbitata Bachli, 1971 c g
 Leucophenga nigroscutellata Duda, 1924 c g
 Leucophenga obscura Chen & Aotsuka, 2003 c g
 Leucophenga obscuripennis (Loew, 1866) c g
 Leucophenga oedipus Seguy, 1938 c g
 Leucophenga okhalkandensis Singh, Dash & Fartyal, 2000 c g
 Leucophenga orientalis Lin & Wheeler, 1972 c g
 Leucophenga ornata Wheeler, 1959 c g
 Leucophenga ornativentris Kahl, 1917 c g
 Leucophenga pacifica Bock, 1986 c g
 Leucophenga palpalis (Adams, 1905) c g
 Leucophenga paludicola Patterson and Mainland, 1944 i c g
 Leucophenga papuana Okada, 1987 c g
 Leucophenga paracapillata Bachli, 1971 c g
 Leucophenga paracuthbertsoni Bachli, 1971 c g
 Leucophenga paraflaviseta Bachli, 1971 c g
 Leucophenga patternella Bock, 1979 c g
 Leucophenga pectinata Okada, 1968 c g
 Leucophenga pentapunctata Panigrahy & Gupta, 1982 c g
 Leucophenga perargentata Bachli, 1971 c g
 Leucophenga pinguifoliacea  g
 Leucophenga piscifoliacea Huang & Chen g
 Leucophenga pleurovirgata Bachli, 1971 c g
 Leucophenga poeciliventris Malloch, 1923 c g
 Leucophenga ponapensis Wheeler & Takada, 1964 c g
 Leucophenga proxima (Adams, 1905) c g
 Leucophenga pulcherrima Patterson and Mainland, 1944 i c g
 Leucophenga pulchra (Schiner, 1868) c g
 Leucophenga quadrifurcata  g
 Leucophenga quadripunctata (Meijere, 1908) c g
 Leucophenga quinquemaculata Strobl, 1893 c g
 Leucophenga quinquemaculipennis Okada, 1956 c g
 Leucophenga ranohira Bachli, Vilela & McEvey, 2005 c g
 Leucophenga rectifoliacea Huang & Chen g
 Leucophenga rectinervis Okada, 1966 c g
 Leucophenga regina Malloch, 1935 c g
 Leucophenga repletoides Bachli, 1971 c g
 Leucophenga retifoliacea  g
 Leucophenga retihirta  g
 Leucophenga rhombura  g
 Leucophenga rimbickana Singh & Gupta, 1981 c g
 Leucophenga rudis (Walker, 1860) c g
 Leucophenga rugatifolia  g
 Leucophenga saigusai Okada, 1968 c g
 Leucophenga salatigae (Meijere, 1914) c g
 Leucophenga samoaensis Harrison, 1954 c g
 Leucophenga scaevolaevora (Seguy, 1951) c g
 Leucophenga schnuseana Duda, 1927 c g
 Leucophenga sculpta Chen & Toda, 1994 c g
 Leucophenga scutellata Malloch, 1923 c g
 Leucophenga securis  g
 Leucophenga sema Burla, 1954 c g
 Leucophenga semicapillata Bachli, 1971 c g
 Leucophenga sericea (Lamb, 1914) c g
 Leucophenga serrata Bachli, 1971 c g
 Leucophenga serrateifoliacea Huang & Chen g
 Leucophenga setipalpis Duda, 1923 c g
 Leucophenga shillongensis Dwivedi & Gupta, 1979 c g
 Leucophenga sierraleonica Bachli, 1971 c g
 Leucophenga sinupenis  g
 Leucophenga sordida Duda, 1923 c g
 Leucophenga sorii Kang, Lee & Bahng, 1965 c g
 Leucophenga spilossoma Lin & Wheeler, 1972 c g
 Leucophenga spinifera Okada, 1987 c g
 Leucophenga stackelbergi Duda, 1934 c g
 Leucophenga stenomaculipennis Okada, 1968 c g
 Leucophenga stigma Bock, 1979 c g
 Leucophenga striata Bachli, 1971 c g
 Leucophenga striatipennis Okada, 1989 c g
 Leucophenga stuckenbergi Bachli, Vilela & McEvey, 2005 c g
 Leucophenga subacutipennis Duda, 1924 c g
 Leucophenga subpollinosa (Meijere, 1914) c g
 Leucophenga subulata Huang & Chen g
 Leucophenga subvirgata Bachli, 1971 c g
 Leucophenga subvittata Duda, 1939 c g
 Leucophenga sujuanae  g
 Leucophenga taiwanensis Lin & Wheeler, 1972 c g
 Leucophenga tenebrosa Bachli, 1971 c g
 Leucophenga tenuipalpis Takada & Momma, 1975 c g
 Leucophenga todai Sidorenko, 1991 c g
 Leucophenga tripunctipennis Malloch, 1926 c g
 Leucophenga trisphenata Wheeler, 1952 i c g
 Leucophenga trispina Upadhyay & Singh, 2007 c g
 Leucophenga tritaeniata Duda, 1923 c g
 Leucophenga trivittata Okada, 1991 c g
 Leucophenga umbratula Duda, 1924 c g
 Leucophenga umbrosa Bachli, 1971 c g
 Leucophenga uncinata Huang & Chen g
 Leucophenga undulata (Hendel, 1913) c g
 Leucophenga unifasciventris Malloch, 1926 c g
 Leucophenga varia (Walker, 1849) i c g b
 Leucophenga varinervis Duda, 1923 c g
 Leucophenga villosa  g
 Leucophenga violae Bock, 1979 c g
 Leucophenga wauensis Okada, 1989 c g
 Leucophenga xanthobasis Curran, 1936 c g
 Leucophenga zebra Bock, 1979 c g
 Leucophenga zhenfangae  g

Data sources: i = ITIS, c = Catalogue of Life, g = GBIF, b = Bugguide.net

References

Leucophenga
Articles created by Qbugbot